Athetis lepigone is a species of moth, belonging to the genus Athetis.

It has cosmopolitan distribution.

References

External links

Acronictinae
Moths described in 1860